Futebol Clube de Canchungo is a Guinea-Bissauan football club based in Canchungo. They currently play in the top domestic Campeonato Nacional da Guiné-Bissau. They are also well known for the excellence of their Academy and the number of players that they form that go to Europe.

The club won the Taça Nacional da Guiné Bissau in 2014 and 2017.

References

Canchungo